Tseng Min-hao (born 15 June 1988) is a Taiwanese badminton player.

Career 
In 2010, he became the runner-up at the MMOA Kaohsiung International Challenge in the mixed doubles event partnered with Chang Hsin-yun. Partnered with Lai Chia-wen, he won the mixed doubles title at the 2012 Singapore International tournament. In 2014, he became the men's doubles runner-up at the Canada Open Grand Prix tournament teamed-up with Liao Min-chun.

Achievements

Summer Universiade 
Mixed doubles

BWF Grand Prix (1 runner-up) 
The BWF Grand Prix has two levels: Grand Prix and Grand Prix Gold. It is a series of badminton tournaments, sanctioned by the Badminton World Federation (BWF) since 2007.

Men's doubles

  BWF Grand Prix Gold tournament
  BWF Grand Prix tournament

BWF International Challenge/Series (4 titles, 4 runners-up) 
Men's doubles

Mixed doubles

  BWF International Challenge tournament
  BWF International Series tournament
  BWF Future Series tournament

References

External links 
 

1988 births
Living people
Sportspeople from Kaohsiung
Taiwanese male badminton players
Universiade medalists in badminton
Asian Games medalists in badminton
Asian Games bronze medalists for Chinese Taipei
Medalists at the 2014 Asian Games
Universiade bronze medalists for Chinese Taipei
Badminton players at the 2014 Asian Games
Medalists at the 2015 Summer Universiade